AB de Villiers is a former South African cricketer who captained the national team between 2012 and 2017. A right-handed batsman, he scored 47 centuries (100 or more runs in a single innings)22 in Tests and 25 in ODIsover his playing career. He reached the top of the ICC Test batting rankings in March 2012.

De Villiers made his Test debut in December 2004 against England, scoring 28 and 15. He made his first Test century the following month, scoring 109 in the drawn fifth Test at Centurion. His first double-century came in April 2008 against India when he scored 217 not out in a man-of-the-match performance in Ahmedabad. , he has scored 22 Test centuries and holds the record for the second-highest individual score by a South African batsman, with 278 not out against Pakistan. , de Villiers has the fourth-highest number of centuries in Tests for South Africa.

De Villiers' made his ODI debut in February 2005 against England; he scored 20 in the tied match. His first century in the format came two years later in a man-of-the-match performance when he scored 146 against the West Indies at Grenada during the 2007 Cricket World Cup. He holds the record for the fastest half-century (off 16 balls) and century (off 31 balls) in ODIs. Both were achieved during the course of his 149 (off 44 balls) against West Indies in January 2015. He hit 16 sixes in the match and leveled the then record of most sixes by a batsman (held by India's Rohit Sharma) in an innings. , he has the joint seventh-highest number (25) of centuries in ODIs.

Between 2006 and 2017, de Villiers played 78 Twenty20 International matches. His highest score of 79 not out was made in the 2009 ICC World Twenty20 match against Scotland which South Africa won by 130-runs. , de Villiers ranks tenth (with 47 centuries) in the all-time list for most centuries in international cricket.

Key

Test centuries

One Day International centuries

Notes

References

External links 
 
 
 

South African cricket lists
International cricket records and statistics
Villiers